Tortang carne norte, also known as corned beef omelette, is an omelette or fritter from Filipino cuisine made by pan-frying an egg and shredded canned corned beef (carne norte) mixture. It is usually seasoned with salt and black pepper, but it can also include onions, scallions, garlic, and/or sugar. It is a popular breakfast meal in the Philippines and is eaten with white rice or pandesal.

See also

Carne norte guisado
Tortang sardinas
Tortang kalabasa
Ukoy

References

External links

Omelettes
Philippine cuisine
Breakfast dishes
Egg dishes
Fried foods
Philippine beef dishes